Lau Tak Yan (born 1 June 1994) is a former Hong Kong professional footballer.

Club career
In 2013, Lau joined then Hong Kong First Division club Citizen but was released after one season when the club decided against applying for a club license in the newly formed, fully professional Hong Kong Premier League.

After a year away from football, he joined Central & Western after being recruited by their manager Fung Chung Ting. He led the club in assists during his season at Central & Western.

In August 2016, Lau went on trial with newly formed HKPL club R&F. After a week of training, he was signed to a contract.

In July 2017, Dreams announced that they had signed Lau ahead of the 2017-18 season. He made his debut for his club in a 2017-18 Senior Shield match against Rangers.

On 24 July 2018, Lau was announced as a player for newly promoted side Hoi King.

On 10 August 2019, it was announced that Lau would join another Hong Kong Premier League club Yuen Long.

International career
In 2009, Lau was selected to the Hong Kong U-16 squad which participated in the 2010 AFC U-16 Championship qualification tournament in China from 19 September to 2 October 2009. On March 28, 2013, he was called up to the Hong Kong U-20 squad and will participate in the 2013 National Games of China football preliminaries from April 2 to April 11, 2013 in Shanghai.

References

External links
 
 Lau Tak Yan at HKFA

Living people
Hong Kong footballers
Association football midfielders
Hong Kong First Division League players
Hong Kong Premier League players
Metro Gallery FC players
Citizen AA players
R&F (Hong Kong) players
Dreams Sports Club players
Hoi King SA players
Yuen Long FC players
1994 births